Danil Sergeyevich Lysenko (born 19 May 1997) is a Russian track and field athlete who specialises in the high jump. He won the silver medal at the 2017 World Championships. He is currently banned from the sport for doping violations and fraud.

Career
Lysenko won his first international medal at the second Summer Youth Olympics, winning a gold medal in the boys' high jump with a clearance of 2.20 m, ahead of Yuji Hiramatsu.

In August 2018, Lysenko was stripped of his Authorized Neutral Athlete status and provisionally suspended, due to his failure to provide whereabouts information as required under IAAF Anti-Doping Rules and Regulations. Lysenko missed three drugs tests between September 2017 and June 2018 which constitutes an anti-doping violation. However, he provided documents stating that he had missed his second test due to being in hospital with acute appendicitis. Further investigations found that the hospital Lysenko was supposedly treated at did not actually exist and he had obtained forged documents through the help of officials at the Russian Athletics Federation. Former President Dmitry Shlyakhtin, board member Artur Karamyan and executive director Alexander Parkin were banned from Athletics for four years by the IAAF, as were senior administrator Elena Orlova and anti-doping coordinator Elena Ikonnikova. Lysenko's coach, Evgeniy Zagorulko, was also banned for four years and in July 2021, Lysenko himself received a six-year disqualification from CAS. He kept competing in Russia despite the ban.

International competitions

Personal bests

See also
List of doping cases in athletics

References

External links

1997 births
Living people
Sportspeople from Bashkortostan
Russian male high jumpers
Athletes (track and field) at the 2014 Summer Youth Olympics
Youth Olympic gold medalists for Russia
Authorised Neutral Athletes at the World Athletics Championships
World Athletics Championships medalists
World Athletics Indoor Championships winners
European Athletics Championships medalists
Russian Athletics Championships winners
Russian sportspeople in doping cases
Doping cases in athletics
Youth Olympic gold medalists in athletics (track and field)